Kennan Jesús Sepúlveda Acevedo (born 8 February 2002) is a Chilean footballer who last played as a forward for Santiago Wanderers.

Career statistics

Club

Notes

References

2002 births
Living people
Sportspeople from Valparaíso
Chilean footballers
Chile youth international footballers
Association football forwards
Santiago Wanderers footballers
Primera B de Chile players
Chilean Primera División players